—Yorkie may refer to:

People
Yorkie (musician) - nickname of musician David Palmer (born 1965), a member of the Liverpool-based band Space from 1997 to 2005 
Yorkie, nickname of George Shaw (footballer, born 1886), Australian rules footballer
Yorkie, a name for someone from York or Yorkshire

Art, entertainment, and media
Yorkie, a principal character in the Black Mirror episode, "San Junipero"
Yorkie Mitchell, a character in The Punisher comic series
PC Tony 'Yorkie' Smith, a character in the British TV drama series The Bill

Other uses
Yorkie (chocolate bar)
Yorkie (Yki), a protein kinase involved in the Hippo signaling pathway, a signaling pathway in cell regulation
Yorkie, the lion mascot for York City F.C.
Yorkshire Terrier, a dog breed